The 4030 Call System briefly "4030-system" is the Iranian telephone system that was created during the early days of the COVID-19 pandemic in Iran for expert consulting and corona-screening (of coronavirus suspects). There are 2000 phone lines and 2,200 doctors and paramedics throughout Iran who are working at this call system, and answer questions related to COVID-19.

4030 call system has been launched by the Execution of Imam Khomeini's Order (Barakat Tel) and in cooperation with the Ministry of Health and Medical Education and Iran Telecommunication in order to screen Iranian families at the field of COVID-19.

As of September 2020, more than 20 million calls have been made to the telephone-system (4030). Iran's Head of 4030 call system, Reza Mazhari stated the telephone line receives diverse calls daily, and with both medical and psychological inquiries. According to Mazhari, 40 percent of these questions related to people's anxiety about COVID-19, and 40 percent were for increasing the awareness regarding the novel virus. He said that this system could decrease the number of people who go to the hospital.

Services 
Among the services of the 4030 Call System are:
 For expert consulting and corona-screening (of coronavirus suspects)
 Answering questions and giving advice to "pregnant and postpartum mothers".
 Phone nutrition consultation
Etc.

See also 

 Barakat Pharmaceutical Group
 Telecommunication Company of Iran
 Execution of Imam Khomeini's Order
 Ministry of Health and Medical Education
 COVIran Barakat

References

Organisations based in Iran
Emergency services in Iran
Telecommunications in Iran
Government-owned companies of Iran
Execution of Imam Khomeini's Order
Government agencies of Iran
COVID-19 pandemic in Iran

External links 
 COVID-19 suspects screened vie 4030 call system